In algebraic topology, the Hattori–Stong theorem, proved by  and ,  gives an isomorphism between the stable homotopy of a Thom spectrum and the primitive elements of its K-homology.

References

Theorems in algebraic topology